Vicuña Huancara Airport is an airport serving Vicuña in the Coquimbo Region of Chile.

Runway length does not include a  paved overrun on the western end. There is mountainous terrain in all quadrants.

See also

Transport in Chile
List of airports in Chile

References

External links
OpenStreetMap - Huancara Airport
OurAirports - Huancara Airport
SkyVector - Huancara Airport
FallingRain - Huancara Airport

Airports in Chile
Airports in Coquimbo Region